The Intel XMM modems are a series of 4G LTE, LTE Advanced, LTE Advanced Pro and 5G modems found in many phones, tablets, laptops and wearables (sans 5g-technology) developed by Intel Mobile Communications. Intel Mobile Communications was formed after Intel acquired the Wireless Solutions (WLS) division of Infineon early in 2011 for US$1.4 billion.

On April 16, 2019, Apple and Qualcomm reached a settlement which included Apple paying an unspecified amount, entering into a six-year patent licensing agreement, and a multi-year agreement for Qualcomm to provide hardware to Apple. Shortly after Intel announced they will exit the 5G smartphone modem business to focus 5G efforts on network infrastructure.

On July 25, 2019, Apple and Intel announced an agreement for Apple to acquire Intel Mobile Communications' smartphone modem business for US$1 billion. Intel will continue to develop modems for non-smartphones such as PCs, Internet of things and autonomous vehicles.

On November 25, 2019, MediaTek and Intel announced a partnership to bring 5G to PCs in 2021.

5G modems

Intel XMM 8160 5G modem 

 Protocols: 5G NR NSA & SA, EN-DC, LTE NR dual-connectivity, Legacy 2G/3G/4G modes, FDD/TDD
 Single Chip Multi-mode support
 Downlink speeds of up to 6 Gbit/s
 Sub-6 GHz and 26/28/39 GHz mmWave
 Intel 10nm process
 Cancelled as of April 16, 2019

Intel XMM 8060 5G modem 

 Protocols: 5G NR NSA & SA, EN-DC, LTE NR dual-connectivity, Legacy 2G/3G/4G modes, FDD/TDD
 Multi-mode support
 Downlink speeds of up to 6 Gbit/s
 Sub-6 GHz and 26/28/39 GHz mmWave
 Intel 14 nm process
 Cancelled as of November 14, 2018

4G modems

Intel XMM 7660 modem 

 Protocols: LTE Advanced Pro, FDD/TDD, DC-HSPA+, TD-SCDMA, GSM/GPRS, CDMA/EVDO, LAA, CBRS
 Downlink LTE: LTE Category 19 (1600 Mbit/s). 7x20 MHz carrier aggregation. Up to 256-QAM. Up to 4x4 MIMO
 Uplink LTE: LTE Category 13 (225 Mbit/s). 3x20 MHz carrier aggregation. Up to 64-QAM
 Support of more than 45 (4G/LTE) bands simultaneously
 Featured in: iPhone 11, 11 Pro/11 Pro Max, iPhone SE 2
 Intel 14nm+ FinFET process
 Released Q3 2019

Intel XMM 7560 modem 

 Protocols: LTE Advanced Pro, FDD/TDD, DC-HSPA+, TD-SCDMA, GSM/GPRS, CDMA/EVDO

 Downlink LTE: LTE Category 16 (1000 Mbit/s). 5x20 MHz carrier aggregation. Up to 256-QAM. Up to 4x4 MIMO
 Uplink LTE: LTE Category 13 (150 Mbit/s). 2x20 MHz carrier aggregation. Up to 64-QAM
 Support of more than 35 (4G/LTE) bands simultaneously
 Featured in: iPhone XS/XS Max/XR, iPad Pro (2018), HP Spectre Folio
 Intel 14nm process
 Released Q3 2018
 Fibocom L860-GL

Intel XMM 7480 modem 

 Protocols: LTE Advanced, FDD/TDD, DC-HSPA+, TD-SCDMA, GSM/GPRS

 Downlink LTE: LTE Category 12 (600 Mbit/s). 4x20 MHz carrier aggregation. Up to 256-QAM
 Uplink LTE: LTE Category 13 (150 Mbit/s). 1x20 MHz carrier aggregation. Up to 64-QAM
 Featured in: iPhone X/iPhone 8 (some model used Snapdragon X16 LTE Modem).
 TSMC 28nm process
 Released Q3 2017
 Apple iPhone 8/iPhone 8 Plus, iPhone X

Intel XMM 7360 modem 

 Protocols: LTE Advanced, FDD/TDD, DC-HSPA+, TD-SCDMA
 Downlink LTE: LTE Category 10 (450 Mbit/s). 3x20 MHz carrier aggregation.
 Uplink LTE: 50 Mbit/s
 Featured in: iPhone 7 (some model used Snapdragon X12 LTE Modem), HP Envy x2
 TSMC 28nm process
 Released Q3 2016
 Apple iPhone 7/iPhone 7 Plus, Fibocom L850-GL

Intel XMM 7260/7262 modem 

 Protocols: LTE Advanced, FDD/TDD, DC-HSPA+, TD-SCDMA
 Downlink LTE: LTE Category 6 (300 Mbit/s). 2x20 MHz carrier aggregation.
 Uplink LTE: 50 Mbit/s
 Featured in: Microsoft Surface 3
 Released Q2 2015
 Fibocom L830

Intel XMM 7160 modem 

 Protocols: LTE-FDD and DC-HSPA+
 Downlink LTE: LTE Category 4 (150 Mbit/s)
 Uplink LTE: 50 Mbit/s
 Featured in: Samsung Galaxy S5
 Released Q2 2014
 Telit LN930

Intel XMM 7120M modem 

 Protocols: LTE FDD and DC-HSPA+
 Downlink LTE: LTE Category 1 (10 Mbit/s)
 Uplink LTE:  LTE Category 1 (5 Mbit/s).
 Featured in: Samsung Galaxy Tab 3 10.1
 Released Q2 2013

3G and 2G modems 

 Intel XMM 6260 (HSPA+)
 Intel XMM 6255/6255M (HSPA)
 Intel XMM 6140 (HSPA)
 Intel XMM 2250/2230 modem (EDGE)
 Intel XMM 1180 modem (GSM/GPRS)
 Intel XMM 1100 modem (GSM/GPRS)

Similar platforms 

 Balong Modems by HiSilicon
 Exynos Modems by Samsung
 Helio M Modems by MediaTek
 Makalu/SC Modems by Unisoc (formally Spreadtrum)
 Snapdragon Modems by Qualcomm

References 

Intel semiconductor IP cores
LTE (telecommunication)
Modems